"Adicto" (English: "Addicted") is a song by American singers Prince Royce and Marc Anthony. The song was released on November 15, 2018  as the second single for Royce's sixth studio album, Alter Ego (2020). The music video premiered on the next day. A salsa version is included in the sixth album. However, it did not feature Marc Anthony even though he is one of the most famous artist of the salsa genre.

Charts

Weekly charts

Year-end charts

Certifications

See also
List of Billboard Tropical Airplay number ones of 2018

References

2018 singles
2018 songs
Prince Royce songs
Marc Anthony songs
Sony Music Latin singles
Songs written by Prince Royce
Songs written by Marc Anthony
Spanish-language songs
Male vocal duets